Tomasz Copik (born April 5, 1978 in Knurów) is a retired Polish footballer and current assistant coach of Odra Opole.

Career

Club career
In December 2010, he joined MKS Kluczbork. In June 2011, he moved to Olimpia Grudziądz.

Coaching career
In the summer 2015, Copik was appointed coach of Odra Opole's U19 team alongside Piotr Plewnia and was also set to continue as head coach of the club's reserve team. In January 2016, Copik became a part of Jan Furlepa's staff for Odra Opoles first team beside his duties with the reserve and U19 teams. 

On 28 August 2019, Copik was promoted to the first team as Piotr Plewnia's assistant coach and therefore also left his position at his former club, Orzeł Źlinice, which he had been the head coach of since 2017 alongside his coaching duties at Odra Opole.

References

External links
 

1978 births
Living people
People from Knurów
Polish footballers
Gwarek Zabrze players
Górnik Zabrze players
Polonia Bytom players
Odra Opole players
Pogoń Szczecin players
Górnik Łęczna players
Szczakowianka Jaworzno players
KSZO Ostrowiec Świętokrzyski players
GKS Jastrzębie players
MKS Kluczbork players
Olimpia Grudziądz players
Sportspeople from Silesian Voivodeship
Association football midfielders